Daniel Steckel House is a historic home located at Bath, Northampton County, Pennsylvania.  It was built in 1803, and is a -story Federal style limestone dwelling. It has an early 19th-century brick addition housing a bake oven, and a frame addition built between 1885 and 1918.  It features two end-wall brick chimneys, and more than 85 percent of the interior fabric remains intact.  It was built as a showplace for the developing settlement of Bath.  The house is open as a bed and breakfast.

It was added to the National Register of Historic Places in 1982.

References

External links
The Steckel House Inn website

Bed and breakfasts in Pennsylvania
Houses on the National Register of Historic Places in Pennsylvania
Federal architecture in Pennsylvania
Houses completed in 1803
Houses in Northampton County, Pennsylvania
National Register of Historic Places in Northampton County, Pennsylvania